Calvin is a township in northeastern Ontario, Canada on the Mattawa River in Nipissing District. The township took its name from Delino Dexter Calvin, an Ontario lumber merchant and MPP based in Frontenac County.

In 2007, Calvin, along with the town of Mattawa and the townships of Papineau-Cameron, Mattawan and Bonfield cooperated to create a newly branded Mattawa Voyageur Country tourist region in order to promote the area.

Communities

The township comprises the communities of Eau Claire and Eau Claire Station.

Demographics 

See also
List of townships in Ontario
List of francophone communities in Ontario

References

External links

Municipalities in Nipissing District
Single-tier municipalities in Ontario